Ogborne is a surname. Notable people with the surname include:

 Alfie Ogborne (born 2003), English cricketer
 Elizabeth Ogborne (1763/4–1853), English antiquary 
 John Ogborne (1755–1837), English engraver

See also
 Osborne (name)